Alec Garnett is an American politician and a former Democratic member of the Colorado House of Representatives and the former Speaker of the House. He represented District 2, which covered a portion of the city of Denver. He was first elected in 2014 to replace retiring House Speaker Mark Ferrandino. On November 2020, Garnett's colleagues elected him to serve as speaker of the Colorado House of Representatives for the two-year term beginning in January 2021. Due to Colorado House term limits, which state a Representative can serve no more than four consecutive terms limiting each member to 8 years of service. Garnett has since been appointed as Governor Polis's Chief of Staff, replacing Lisa Kaufmann.

Career
Prior to taking office, Garnet was the executive director of the Colorado Democratic Party. He previously worked as a legislative assistant to U.S. Representative Ed Perlmutter and legislative director to U.S. Representative John Adler.

Garnett was elected to his seat in 2014 with 72.6% of the vote against Republican Party opponent Jon Roberts. He was reelected in 2016 with 73.28% of the vote against Republican opponent Paul Linton.

Garnett serves on the House Appropriations Committee, the House Business Affairs and Labor Committee, and the House Education Committee.

Personal life
Garnet's father, Stan, is the former district attorney for Boulder County, Colorado.

References

External links
Official campaign website

|-

21st-century American politicians
Democratic Party members of the Colorado House of Representatives
Living people
Politicians from Denver
Speakers of the Colorado House of Representatives
University of Colorado Denver alumni
Year of birth missing (living people)